Hugues Bousiges (born January 7, 1948 in Rennes, Ille-et-Vilaine) is  a French civil servant.

Career
 1996-1998: sub-prefect of L'Haÿ-les-Roses, Val-de-Marne, Île-de-France.
 2002-2004: prefect of Haute-Loire in Le Puy-en-Velay.
 2004-2005: prefect of Charente in Angoulême.
 2007-2009: prefect of Pyrénées-Orientales in Perpignan. 
 On 2009: prefect of Gard in Nîmes.

Honours and awards
: Chevalier of the Legion of Honour
: Commandeur of the National Order of Merit
: Officier of the Ordre des Palmes Académiques
: Officier of the Mérite agricole
: Chevalier of the Ordre du Mérite Maritime
: Chevalier of Arts and letters

References
  “Bousiges, Hugues, Patrick, Jean” (prefect, born 1948), page 373 in Who’s Who in France : Dictionnaire biographique de personnalités françaises vivant en France et à l’étranger, et de personnalités étrangères résidant en France, 44th edition for 2013 édited in 2012, 2371 p., 31 cm,  . 
  http://www.whoswho.fr/bio/hugues-bousiges_34871 : Who’s Who in France on line (fee). Retrieved on 16 February 2013.
  His page on the Gard prefecture's website. Retrieved on 16 February 2013.

Notes

Living people
1948 births
People from Rennes
Prefects of France
Prefects of Pyrénées-Orientales
Prefects of Gard
Chevaliers of the Légion d'honneur
Chevaliers of the Ordre des Arts et des Lettres
Officiers of the Ordre des Palmes Académiques
Officers of the Order of Agricultural Merit
Commanders of the Ordre national du Mérite